A water taxi or a water bus is a watercraft used to provide public or private transport, usually, but not always, in an urban environment. Service may be scheduled with multiple stops, operating in a similar manner to a bus, or on demand to many locations, operating in a similar manner to a taxi. A boat service shuttling between two points would normally be described as a ferry rather than a water bus or taxi.

The term water taxi is usually confined to a boat operating on demand, and water bus to a boat operating on a schedule. In North American usage, the terms are roughly synonymous.

The earliest water taxi service was recorded as operating around the area that became Manchester, England.

Locations
Cities and other places operating water buses and/or taxis include:

On demand water taxis are also commonly found in marinas, harbours and cottage areas, providing access to boats and waterfront properties that are not directly accessible by land.

Incidents
On March 6, 2004, a water taxi on the Seaport Taxi service operated by the Living Classrooms Foundation capsized during a storm on the Patapsco River, near Baltimore's Inner Harbor. A total of five passengers died in the accident, which the National Transportation Safety Board determined was caused by insufficient stability when the small pontoon-style vessel encountered strong winds and waves. The company no longer operates water taxi vessels in Baltimore harbor.

See also
 Duffy-Herreshoff watertaxi
 Ferry, including hydrofoil, catamaran and hovercraft
 Klotok
 Moskvitch-class motorship - Soviet "water tramway"
 Pleasure barge
 Rower woman
 Ship's tender

References

External links
 

 
Boat types
Ferries
Vehicles for hire